Qingyuan Lu Station is a station on the  of the Beijing Subway.

Station layout 
The station has an underground island platform.

Exits 
There are 3 exits, lettered A, B, and C. Exit C is accessible.

References

External links

Beijing Subway stations in Daxing District
Railway stations in China opened in 2010